Type 21 can refer to:

 Type 21 frigate, or Amazon-class frigate, a late-20th-century escort vessel of the Royal Navy.
 Type 021-class missile boat, a Chinese missile-firing naval vessel first produced in about 1975, and still in production.
 Type XXI submarine, a German technologically advanced submarine produced in 1945.
 Type 21 Radar, a radar of the Imperial Japanese Navy